Cornelius J. "Connie" Murphy (March 27, 1909 – December 2, 1931) was an American football player.  A native of Greenfield, Massachusetts, Murphy was an all-around athlete at Greenfield High School.  He attended Deerfield Academy for two years before enrolling at Fordham University. He played at the tackle position for the Fordham Rams football team.  As a sophomore, he was selected by the International News Service as a first-team player on the 1930 College Football All-America Team. As a junior, he sustained a head injury in a football game played at the Polo Grounds on November 21, 1931.  He died several days later on December 2, 1931, when a blood vessel at the base of his brain re-ruptured. There is a bronze bust of him on the Fordham campus.

References 

1909 births
1931 deaths
American football halfbacks
Fordham Rams football players
Players of American football from Massachusetts
Sports deaths in New York (state)
Sports competitors who died in competition